HMS E14 was a British E class submarine built by Vickers, Barrow-in-Furness. During the First World War, two of her captains were awarded the Victoria Cross, and many of her officers and men also decorated. HMS E14 was laid down on 14 December 1912 and was commissioned on 18 November 1914. Her hull cost £105,700. She was sunk by shellfire from coastal batteries in the Dardanelles on 28 January 1918.

Design
She was powered by two  Vickers eight-cylinder two-stroke diesel engines and two  electric motors.

As with most of the early E class boats, E14 was not fitted with a deck gun during construction, but later had a single 6-pounder QF gun mounted forward of the conning tower at Malta dockyard. She had five 18 inch (450 mm) torpedo tubes, two in the bow, one either side amidships, and one in the stern; a total of 10 torpedoes were carried.

E-Class submarines had wireless systems with  power ratings; in some submarines, these were later upgraded to  systems by removing a midship torpedo tube. Their maximum design depth was  although in service some reached depths of below  (other sources say 160ft design depth, 350ft crush depth ). Some submarines contained Fessenden oscillator systems.

Crew
Her complement was three officers and 28 men.

Service history
E14 took part in an operation to penetrate the Sea of Marmara. She successfully dived beneath the minefields and broke into the Sea of Marmara on 27 April 1915. She quickly sank the Turkish gunboat Nurel Bahr, sinking 200 tons on 1 May. She then went on to damage the minelayer Peik I Shevket sinking 1014 tons in a torpedo attack. On 3 May she torpedoed transportship Gul Djemal with 4,000 soldiers on board.

Upon her return, her captain, Lieutenant Commander Edward Courtney Boyle received the Victoria Cross; Lieutenant Edward Geldard Stanley and Acting Lieutenant Reginald Wilfred Lawrence were both awarded the Distinguished Service Cross and all the ratings were awarded the Distinguished Service Medal.

Later in her career, her new captain, Lieutenant Commander Geoffrey Saxton White was posthumously awarded the Victoria Cross for his actions in the Dardanelles. With the ex-Goeben crippled after the Battle of Imbros, E14 was dispatched to finish off the Turkish battlecruiser when repeated air attacks failed to destroy her.

Finding the Goeben gone, E14 attacked a merchant ship as she withdrew from the Dardanelles. Firing two torpedoes, one prematurely exploded damaging the submarine. She was forced to surface because of flooding but then came under coastal battery fire off Kum Kale.

Then, while attempting to beach safely, White was killed by shellfire. E14 sank, but nine of her crew survived and were taken prisoner.

Wreck
In June 2012, after a three-year search, Turkish marine engineer Selçuk Kolay and filmmaker Savas Karakas discovered the wreck of E14 in 20 m of water about 250 m off Kum Kale.

The boat is largely buried in sand, only 7 m of the coral-encrusted bow, with a shell hole, remaining visible. The British government is to ask the Turkish authorities to ensure the wreck is respected as a war grave.

References 

 Akerman, P. (1989). Encyclopaedia of British submarines 1901–1955.  p. 150. Maritime Books.

External links
'Submarine losses 1904 to present day' - Royal Navy Submarine Museum
First World War British submarine found 94 years after being abandoned

External links 
  Lost submarine found after 92 years. Sabah Turkish Edition 01-06-2012

British E-class submarines of the Royal Navy
Ships built in Barrow-in-Furness
1914 ships
World War I submarines of the United Kingdom
Maritime incidents in 1918
World War I shipwrecks in the Aegean Sea
Royal Navy ship names